Desert Ridge Marketplace is a super-regional shopping mall located just off the Loop 101 and Tatum Boulevard in North Phoenix, Arizona. It was built by Vestar Development Co. and opened in December 2001. The mall has a gross leasable area of 1.2 million square feet (111,000 m2). The mall was targeted at upscale residents of the north East Valley, and of Scottsdale, a five-minute drive from the mall via the freeway.

The mall was revamped in 2017 with a repaint of stores, a fountain installed in the entrance and a new, modern logo.

References

External links
 Official Site

Shopping malls in Arizona
Buildings and structures in Phoenix, Arizona
Shopping malls in Maricopa County, Arizona
Shopping malls established in 2001
2001 establishments in Arizona